Melkbos is an Afrikaans word which may refer to:
 Sideroxylon inerme, the white milkwood or "melkbos"
 Melkbosstrand, a coastal village north of Cape Town, South Africa
 Euphorbia damarana, or Damara milk-bush